Amar De Nuevo (lit: Love again) is a 1998 album by Chilean Group Inti-Illimani, in which they explore the heritage of Latin American Creole music. It is the eighth studio album by Inti-Illimani.

Track listing

 Antes De Amar De Nuevo
 Esta Eterna Costumbre
 La Fiesta Eres Tu
 La Indiferencia
 Negra Presuntuosa
 Entre Amor
 El Faro
 La Sombra
 La Carta Del Adios
 La Negrita
 Corrido De La Soberbia

References 

1999 albums